This is a list of the National Register of Historic Places listings in Skagway, Alaska.

This is intended to be a complete list of the districts on the National Register of Historic Places in Skagway, Alaska, United States.  The locations of National Register districts for which the latitude and longitude coordinates are included below, may be seen in a Google map.

There are 3 districts listed on the National Register in the borough, including 2 National Historic Landmarks.

Current listings

|}

See also 

 List of National Historic Landmarks in Alaska
 National Register of Historic Places listings in Alaska

Notes

References 

 
Skagway